Molly Pike (born 22 January 2001) is an English professional footballer who plays as a midfielder for Leicester City of the FA WSL. Pike spent her youth years at Chelsea and has captained the England U19 team.

Club career 
Pike rose through the youth ranks at Chelsea, scoring 14 goals in 17 appearances as Chelsea finished runners-up in the 2018–19 WSL Academy League season.

In July 2019, Pike moved to Everton and signed her first professional contract. She made her senior debut on the 15 September 2019 against Bristol City in a 2–0 league win. She scored her first goal for the team on 21 November 2019 in a 4–1 defeat to Manchester City during the 2019–20 FA Women's League Cup group stage. Three days later she scored her first WSL, the opener in a 3–1 win at home to Tottenham Hotspur. She made a total of 21 appearances in her debut season including as a stoppage time substitute in the 2020 Women's FA Cup Final at Wembley Stadium as Everton lost 3–1 to Manchester City in extra-time.

With her game time limited to six appearances including only one start during the first half of the 2020–21 season, on 28 January 2021 Pike joined WSL team Bristol City on loan for the rest of the season.

On 4 July 2021 Pike signed with newly promoted Leicester City ahead of their first season in the FA WSL.

International career 
Pike has captained the England U19 team.

Career statistics

Club 
.

References

External links 
 
 

2001 births
Living people
English women's footballers
Women's association football midfielders
Women's Super League players
Everton F.C. (women) players
Bristol City W.F.C. players
Leicester City W.F.C. players
England women's youth international footballers